Cheong is a name for various sweetened foods in the form of syrups, marmalades, and fruit preserves. In Korean cuisine, cheong is used as a tea base, as a honey-or-sugar-substitute in cooking, as a condiment, and also as an alternative medicine to treat the common cold and other minor illnesses.

Originally, the word cheong was used to refer to honey in Korean royal court cuisine. The name jocheong ("crafted honey") was given to mullyeot (liquid-form yeot) and other human-made honey-substitutes. Outside the royal court, honey has been called kkul, which is the native (non-Sino-Korean) word.

Varieties 
 Jocheong ("crafted honey") or mullyeot (liquid yeot): rice syrup or more recently also corn syrup
 Maesil-cheong or Maesilaek ("plum syrup")
 Mogwa-cheong (quince preserve)
 Mucheong (radish syrup)
 Mu-kkul-cheong (radish and honey syrup)
 Yuja-cheong (yuzu marmalade)
 Saenggang-cheong (ginger marmalade)
 Gochu-cheong (Korean green chili marmalade)
 Maneul-cheong (garlic pickle)
 Yangpa-cheong (onion marmalade)
 Odi-cheong (mulberry marmalade)
 Omija-cheong (magnolia berry marmalade)
 Painaepeul-cheong (pineapple marmalade)
 Bae-cheong (Korean pear marmalade)
 Bae-doraji-cheong (Korean pear and bellflower root marmalade)

Maesil-cheong 
Maesil-cheong, also called "plum syrup", is an anti-microbial syrup made by sugaring ripe plums (Prunus mume). In Korean cuisine, maesil-cheong is used as a condiment and sugar substitute. The tea made by mixing water with maesil-cheong is called maesil-cha (plum tea).

It can be made by simply mixing plums and sugar together, and then leaving them for about 100 days. To make syrup, the ratio of sugar to plum should be at least 1:1 to prevent fermentation, by which the liquid may turn into maesil-ju (plum wine). The plums can be removed after 100 days, and the syrup can be consumed right away, or mature for a year or more.

Mogwa-cheong 
Mogwa-cheong, also called "preserved quince", is a cheong made by sugaring Chinese quince (Pseudocydonia sinensis). Either sugar or honey can be used to make mogwa-cheong. Mogwa-cheong is used as a tea base for mogwa-cha (quince tea) and mogwa-hwachae (quince punch), or as an ingredient in sauces and salad dressings.

Yuja-cheong 
Yuja-cheong, also called "yuja marmalade", is a marmalade-like cheong made by sugaring peeled, depulped, and thinly sliced yuja (Citrus junos). It is used as a tea base for yuja-cha (yuja tea), as a honey-or-sugar-substitute in cooking, and as a condiment.

Gallery

See also
 Fruit syrup
 List of spreads
 List of syrups
 Korean tea
 Yeot

References

External links 
 

Condiments
Food ingredients
Food preservation
Honey
Jams and jellies
Korean condiments
Marmalade
Preserved fruit
Syrup
Citrus dishes